Austrogynacantha is a genus of dragonfly in the family Aeshnidae. Austrogynacantha heterogena, commonly known as the Australian duskhawker, is the only known species of this genus
which is found in Australia
and New Caledonia.

Austrogynacantha heterogena is a medium-sized dragonfly, darkly coloured with bright green or yellow markings. It is a vagrant, is active at dawn and dusk, and inhabits still waters.

Gallery

Note
The Australian duskhawker, Austrogynacantha heterogena, should not be confused with almost-similarly named Australasian duskhawker, Anaciaeschna jaspidea, a different species of Aeshnid dragonfly.

References

Aeshnidae
Anisoptera genera
Monotypic Odonata genera
Odonata of Australia
Odonata of Oceania
Taxa named by Robert John Tillyard
Insects described in 1908